Seychelles, which is an independent island chain in the Indian Ocean, has a distinct kind of music. Folk music incorporates multiple influences in a syncretic fashion, including English contredanse, polka and mazurka, French folk and pop, sega from Mauritius and Réunion, taarab, zouk, soukous moutya and other pan-African genres, as well as Polynesian and Indian  music.  A complex form of percussion music called Kanmtole is popular, along with combinations of Sega and Reggae called Seggae and combinations of Moutya and Reggae called Mouggae, as is Montea, a fusion of native folk rhythms with Kenyan benga developed by Patrick Victor. Jean Marc Volcy is another famous Seychellois musician who has brought a modern touch to traditional music. He has several albums including Sove Lavi.

The growth of Seychelles music has since seen the adoption of a blend of contemporary reggae and mainstream, international popular music.

See also
List of Seychellois musicians

References
Ewens, Graeme and Werner Graebner. "A Lightness of Touch". 2000. In Broughton, Simon and Ellingham, Mark with McConnachie, James and Duane, Orla (Ed.), World Music, Vol. 1: Africa, Europe and the Middle East, pp 505–508. Rough Guides Ltd, Penguin Books.

External links
Seynews (registration may be required)